Jaime Chavín (25 July 1899 – 20 July 1971) was an Argentine footballer. He played in four matches for the Argentina national football team from 1918 to 1921. He was also part of Argentina's squad for the 1917 South American Championship.

References

External links
 
 

1899 births
1971 deaths
Argentine footballers
Argentina international footballers
Place of birth missing
Association football forwards
Club Atlético Huracán footballers
Club Atlético River Plate footballers
Argentino de Quilmes players